Kevin Robbins (born December 12, 1966) is a former American football tackle and guard. He played in the National Football League (NFL) for the Cleveland Browns from 1989 to 1990 and for the Los Angeles Rams in 1993.

References

1966 births
Living people
American football offensive tackles
American football offensive guards
Wichita State Shockers football players
Michigan State Spartans football players
Cleveland Browns players
Los Angeles Rams players
H. D. Woodson High School alumni